Anatoly Ivanovich Grigoriev (23 March 1943 – 11 February 2023) was a Soviet and Russian physiologist. He was a Doctor of Sciences (1980), Professor at the Lomonosov Moscow State University, Honored Scientist of the Russian Federation (1996). Laureate of the 1989 USSR State Prize and winner of the 2001 State Prize of the Russian Federation. Disciple of Oleg Gazenko, Grigoriev was one of the leading scientists in bioastronautics and space flight medicine.

Early life and education 
Grigoriev was born in Medelivka, Reichskommissariat Ukraine on 23 March 1943. In 1966, Grigoriev graduated from the Russian National Research Medical University.

Grigoriev was a student of Academicians  and Oleg Gazenko.

In 1970, Grigoriev defended his Candidate's Dissertation. In 1980, he defended his doctoral dissertation.

Career 
In 1986, he received the title of Professor. Grigoriev was elected a Corresponding Member of the USSR Academy of Medical Sciences in 1988. He was elected a Member of the Russian Academy of Medical Sciences in 1993. He was elected a Corresponding Member of the Academy of Sciences of the USSR in 1990. Grigoriev was a doctor honoris causa of the University of Lyon.

Grigoriev was also Editor-in-Chief of the Aviakosmicheskaya i Ekologicheskaya Meditsina, and the author of more than 500 scientific papers. 

From 2007 to 2017, Grigoriev served as Vice-president of the Russian Academy of Sciences. From 1988 to 2008 he was Director of the Institute of Biomedical Problems.

Grigoriev died on 11 February 2023, at the age of 79.

References

External links
Institute of Biomedical Problems official site

1943 births
2023 deaths
Russian physiologists
Soviet physiologists
Academic staff of Moscow State University
Full Members of the Russian Academy of Sciences
Corresponding Members of the USSR Academy of Sciences
Academicians of the Russian Academy of Medical Sciences
Corresponding Members of the USSR Academy of Medical Sciences
Recipients of the Order "For Merit to the Fatherland", 2nd class
Recipients of the Order "For Merit to the Fatherland", 3rd class
Recipients of the Order "For Merit to the Fatherland", 4th class
Honoured Scientists of the Russian Federation
Recipients of the Order of the Red Banner of Labour
Recipients of the USSR State Prize
State Prize of the Russian Federation laureates
Demidov Prize laureates
Officiers of the Légion d'honneur
Recipients of the Banner of Labor
Recipients of the Decoration for Services to the Republic of Austria